Alexander Carl von Hoffman (born July 11, 1951, in United States) is an American urban planner and historian. He is currently Lecturer in Urban Planning and Design at the Harvard University Graduate School of Design and Senior Research Fellow at Harvard's Joint Center for Housing Studies. He is a specialist on the history and policy of housing, particularly of low-income housing policy in the United States.

Career
Von Hoffman was born to Ann Cremin Byrne, daughter of the architect Barry Byrne who apprenticed with Frank Lloyd Wright, and Nicholas von Hoffman, a descendant of Carl von Hoffman and Melchior Hoffman. Von Hoffman received a Bachelor of Arts in English (1977), where he was honored as summa cum laude, and a Master of Arts in History (1979) from the University of Massachusetts, Boston. He then received a Master of Arts (1980) and a doctorate (1986) in History from Harvard University. His dissertation focused on the development of Jamaica Plain. Upon graduating, he was named assistant professor of urban planning at Harvard's Graduate School of Design. In 1990, von Hoffman was promoted to the level of associate professor, a post which he held until 1995.

In 1998, von Hoffman joined Harvard's Joint Center for Housing Studies as senior fellow. From that point until present, he has also been a lecturer in urban planning and design at the Graduate School of Design.

From 1995 to 2002, von Hoffman served on the board of directors of The Bostonian Society, and since 2004, he has served on the board of directors of the Journal of Urban History.

Selected works
Local Attachments: The Making of an American Urban Neighborhood, 1850 to 1920, Johns Hopkins University Press, 1994
House by House, Block by Block: The Rebirth of America's Urban Neighborhoods, Oxford University Press, 2003

References

External links
Harvard Joint Center for Housing Studies profile
Harvard GSD profile
Harvard Kennedy School profile

1951 births
Living people
American people of German descent
American people of Russian descent
Historians from Massachusetts
American urban planners
University of Massachusetts Boston alumni
Harvard Graduate School of Arts and Sciences alumni
Harvard Graduate School of Design faculty